Yeah Yeah Yeah may refer to:

Music
 Yeah Yeah Yeahs, an American rock band

Albums
 Yeah Yeah Yeah (compilation), a garage rock compilation album, 1999
 Yeah Yeah Yeah, by the Blondes, 1990
 Yeah Yeah Yeahs (EP), by the Yeah Yeah Yeahs, 2001

Songs
 "Yeah Yeah Yeah" (Blackpink song), 2022
 "Yeah Yeah Yeah" (Louis Prima song), 1951
 "Yeah Yeah Yeah" (New Politics song), 2010
 "Yeah! Yeah! Yeah!" (Oaktown's 357 song), 1989
 "Yeah! Yeah! Yeah!" (Simone Hines song), 1997
 "Yeah 3x" (pronounced "Yeah Yeah Yeah"), by Chris Brown, 2010
 "Yeah Yeah Yeah", by Alice Cooper, B-side of the single "Be My Lover", 1972
 "Yeah Yeah Yeah", by Bo Diddley from Hey! Good Lookin', 1965
 "Yeah Yeah Yeah", by Jax Jones, 2015
 "Yeah Yeah Yeah", by Judson Spence, 1988
 "Yeah Yeah Yeah", by Lil' Mo, 2005
 "Yeah Yeah Yeah", by the Sounds from Something to Die For, 2011
 "Yeah Yeah Yeah", by Uncle Kracker from Double Wide, 2000
 "Yeah, Yeah, Yeah!", by Voices, 1992

See also
"She Loves You", a 1963 song by the Beatles that frequently uses the phrase "Yeah, Yeah, Yeah!"
"Ignoreland", a 1992 song by R.E.M.
 Yeah Yeah Yeah Yeah, the Bikini Kill side of a 1993 split album with Huggy Bear
 "Yeah Yeah Yeah Yeah Yeah", a 1988 song by the Pogues
 Yeah (disambiguation)
 Yeah Yeah (disambiguation)